Zach Robert Plesac (born January 21, 1995) is an American professional baseball pitcher for the Cleveland Guardians of Major League Baseball (MLB). He played college baseball at Ball State University. Plesac was selected in the 12th round of the 2016 Major League Baseball draft by the Cleveland Indians. He made his MLB debut in 2019.

Amateur career
Plesac was born in Crown Point, Indiana, and attended Crown Point High School, where he earned many accolades. Plesac starred in football, basketball, and baseball at CPHS. 

He enrolled at Ball State University in 2014 and played college baseball for the Ball State Cardinals. In his freshman year, he had a 12–2 win–loss record with a 2.11 earned run average (ERA) and six saves in 25 games played, with six games started, to earn Collegiate Baseball Newspaper Freshman Pitcher of the Year honors. He was also named to the American Baseball Coaches Association/Rawlings All-Midwest Region Team, a National Collegiate Baseball Writers Association Freshman All-American, a Louisville Slugger Third Team All-American, the Mid-American Conference Freshman Pitcher of the Year and a Collegiate Baseball Freshman All-American. In 2015, he was 5–5 with a 3.27 ERA in 16 starts to earn All-MAC Second Team honors. He also played for the Wareham Gatemen of the Cape Cod League that year, and was 0–2 with an 11.88 ERA.

Professional career
Plesac was selected in the 12th round (362nd overall) of the 2016 Major League Baseball draft by the Cleveland Indians and signed on June 29, 2016, for a  $100,000 signing bonus, but did not play in 2016. 

He began his professional career in 2017 with the Class A Short Season Mahoning Valley Scrappers, and after posting a 1.38 ERA in eight games (seven starts), was promoted to the Class A Lake County Captains where he finished the season, posting a 1–1 record with a 3.60 ERA in six starts.

In 2018, Plesac played for both the Class A-Advanced Lynchburg Hillcats and the Double-A Akron RubberDucks, pitching to a combined 11–6 record with a 3.79 ERA in 26 total starts between both teams. He returned to Akron to begin 2019, and was promoted to the Triple-A Columbus Clippers in early May.

The Indians selected Plesac's contract from the Clippers on May 28, 2019. He made his MLB debut that day at Fenway Park against the Boston Red Sox, allowing one run on four hits in  innings and receiving a no decision.
In the middle of a heated wildcard playoff race, Plesac pitched a 4 hit shutout against the Los Angeles Angels. It was both Plesac's first complete game and first shutout of his career. For the season, Plesac ended with a 8–6 record in 21 starts. He struck out 88 in  innings.

In his first start of the 2020 season, Plesac had one of the best outings of his career against the White Sox, going eight innings, striking out 11, and allowing no earned runs. On August 9, Plesac was sent home by the Indians via car service after violating team and Major League Baseball COVID-19 protocols after going out with friends in Chicago following a game against the White Sox. Plesac later issued a statement apologizing.

With the 2020 Cleveland Indians, Plesac appeared in eight games, compiling a 4–2 record with 2.28 ERA and 57 strikeouts in  innings pitched. In 2021, the Indians were no-hit three times, and Plesac was the opposing pitcher in all three instances, setting an MLB record.

Plesac's 2021 campaign saw him earn his first 10-win season with a 10-6 record, a 4.67 ERA, and 100 strikeouts. In a peculiar coincidence, Plesac was the starting pitcher on the opposite end of three no-hitters; the Indians were the first team to be no-hit in three games in one season.

In 2022 he was 3-12 with a 4.31 ERA in 131.2 innings, with a 1.322 WHIP.

On January 13, 2023, Plesac agreed to a one-year, $2.95 million contract with the Guardians, avoiding salary arbitration.

Personal life
Zach is the son of Ron and Jeannie Plesac, and he has two brothers. His uncle, Dan Plesac, played in the major leagues from 1986 to 2003. Another uncle, Joe Plesac, played in the minor leagues from 1982 to 1987.

References

External links

1995 births
Living people
People from Crown Point, Indiana
Baseball players from Indiana
Major League Baseball pitchers
Cleveland Indians players
Cleveland Guardians players
Ball State Cardinals baseball players
Wareham Gatemen players
Mahoning Valley Scrappers players
Lake County Captains players
Lynchburg Hillcats players
Akron RubberDucks players
Columbus Clippers players